The Zionist Union (translit. HaMaḥaneh HaẒiyoni, lit. the Zionist Camp) was a centre-left political alliance in Israel. It was established in December 2014 by the Israeli Labor Party and Hatnuah to create a joint electoral list to contest the 2015 elections with the hope of unseating Prime Minister Benjamin Netanyahu. It failed to do so but did come in second place with 24 seats in the Knesset, forming the official opposition. However, tension between the Union's competing factions resulted in its dissolution in early January 2019, ahead of that year's April election.

History
The Labor Party and Hatnuah agreed on 10 December 2014 to form a joint ticket. The list was established to create a large electoral list for the centre-left bloc, in the hope that it will lead the 34th government. Hatnuah leader Tzipi Livni has said that other parties will also be part of the alliance. Livni and Labor leader Isaac Herzog initially said that if the alliance were to win enough seats to lead the next government, they would rotate in the post of Prime Minister, with Herzog serving for the first half of the Knesset's four-year term and Livni for the second half, though Livni announced on 16 March 2015 that only Herzog would serve as prime minister.

Manuel Trajtenberg, number 11 on the list, was the list's candidate for finance minister. Amos Yadlin was the list's candidate for defense minister, though he was not a candidate for the Knesset. The Green Movement also had representation on the list through the addition of Yael Cohen Paran, selected by Livni, on a spot (No. 25) reserved for Hatnuah members.

Composition

Ideology and platform

Main issues
Key issues for the Zionist Union included the following:
Solving economic woes and reducing the cost of living
Tackling the housing crisis by providing land for free in the public domain for housing developments and increasing overall government expenditure
Reducing the costs of health care, education, and basic goods
Closing the gap between rich and poor
Reigniting negotiations with the Palestinians
Initiating negotiations as part of a collective effort with regional allies Egypt and Jordan, before presenting a peace initiative to the Arab League
Shifting Israeli–Palestinian conflict resolution away from unilateral action (including that by the Palestinian Authority at UN agencies and the ICC) and back to a bilateral process supported by the international community
Halting construction in isolated settlements
Repairing ties with the United States and the European Union

Other positions
In addition, the Zionist Union is in favor of the following:
The enactment of green legislation
Dismantlement of "the gas monopoly"
Implementation of Clean Air Law measures
Removal of environmental hazards from the Haifa Bay by preventing the expansion of Oil Refineries Ltd. and evacuating the ammonia facility
Stronger protection for animal welfare
Greater progress and pluralism on religion-and-state issues
Civil marriage in Israel, including for same-sex couples
Legal standing to non-Orthodox streams of Judaism
Partial operation of public transportation on Saturdays
The legalization of medical marijuana

2015 election

List of Knesset members

The following are the candidates elected to the 20th Knesset from the Zionist Union's party list.

Isaac Herzog
Tzipi Livni
Shelly Yachimovich
Stav Shaffir
Itzik Shmuli
Omer Bar-Lev
Yehiel Bar
Amir Peretz
Merav Michaeli
Eitan Cabel
Mickey Rosenthal
Revital Swid
Yoel Hasson
Zouheir Bahloul
Eitan Broshi
Michal Biran
Nachman Shai
Ksenia Svetlova
Ayelet Nahmias-Verbin
Yossi Yona
Eyal Ben-Reuven
Yael Cohen-Paran
Saleh Saad
Leah Fadida

Election results

After the election, the Zionist Union emerged as the second-largest party in the Knesset, with 24 seats. It triumphed in Tel Aviv and its prosperous suburbs, as well as other liberal areas. Its success was mostly in affluent areas, and it won the highest number of votes in 28 of Israel's 33 wealthiest communities.

References

External links
 

2014 establishments in Israel
2019 disestablishments in Israel
Centre-left parties in Asia
Defunct political party alliances in Israel
Israeli Labor Party
Political parties disestablished in 2019
Political parties established in 2014
Social democratic parties in Israel
Zionist political parties in Israel